Kriti Sanon (born 27 July 1990) is an Indian actress who works in Hindi and Telugu-language films. After pursuing a degree in engineering from the Jaypee Institute of Information Technology, she briefly worked as a fashion model. Sanon began her acting career by playing the leading lady in the 2014 action films 1: Nenokkadine and Heropanti. The latter earned her the Filmfare Award for Best Female Debut.

Sanon's career progressed with starring roles in the commercially successful romantic comedies Bareilly Ki Barfi (2017) and Luka Chuppi (2019), and her highest-grossing releases came with the ensemble comedies Dilwale (2015) and Housefull 4 (2019). She won the Filmfare Award for Best Actress for playing the titular role of a surrogate mother in Mimi (2021).

Sanon appeared in Forbes India Celebrity 100 list of 2019. She has launched her own line of clothing and a fitness company, and has also served as the ambassador of several brands and products.

Early life 
Sanon was born on 27 July 1990 in New Delhi to Rahul Sanon, a chartered accountant and Geeta Sanon, a physics professor at the University of Delhi. Her family is Punjabi. She attended Delhi Public School, R. K. Puram and later secured a Bachelor of Technology degree in Electronics and Telecommunication Engineering from Jaypee Institute of Information Technology, Noida. She briefly worked as a model before becoming an actress. Her sister, Nupur, is also an actress.

Career

Early work (2014–2020) 

Sanon made her acting debut in 2014 with the Telugu psychological action thriller 1: Nenokkadine, playing the love interest of Mahesh Babu's character. The part required her to participate in action sequences filmed at sea; she has said that the experience made her nervous as she did not know how to swim. Reviewers for The Times of India and Sify took note of her beauty and were encouraging of her acting prowess. After completing the first schedule of 1: Nenokkadine, Sanon was signed on for Heropanti, a Hindi action film opposite newcomer Tiger Shroff; she divided her time between both films. Trade journalist Taran Adarsh opined that Sanon "has the trappings of a star", but critic Srijana Das of The Times of India criticised her emoting, calling it "more cheesy than sharp". Heropanti emerged as a commercial success. Sanon was nominated for the SIIMA Award for Best Female Debut – Telugu for 1: Nenokkadine, and she won the Filmfare Award for Best Female Debut and the IIFA Award for Star Debut of the Year – Female for Heropanti.

The following year, Sanon had her second Telugu film release in the crime drama Dohchay, co-starring Naga Chaitanya. She was next cast in Rohit Shetty's action comedy Dilwale with Varun Dhawan, Shah Rukh Khan and Kajol, which emerged as one of the highest-grossing Indian films at that time, grossing more than  worldwide. Anupama Chopra disliked the film and wrote that Sanon and Dhawan "work as bait, meant to bring in the critical youth segment".

After a yearlong absence from the screen, Sanon teamed with Maddock Films producer Dinesh Vijan, in their first of many collaborations, in his directorial debut Raabta (2017), which featured her and Sushant Singh Rajput as star-crossed lovers. In a scathing review, Sukanya Verma of Rediff.com labelled the film "embarrassingly daft" but took note of Sanon's "statuesque, spirited presence". The film failed commercially. Sanon's starring role as a headstrong small-town woman aspiring to a better life in Ashwiny Iyer Tiwari's romantic comedy Bareilly Ki Barfi was better received. Co-starring Ayushmann Khurrana and Rajkummar Rao as her love interests, the film was an adaptation of French writer Nicholas Barreau's novel The Ingredients of Love. Saibal Chatterjee of NDTV noted that "the burden of making Bareilly Ki Barfi work rests upon Kriti Sanon and she doesn't put a foot wrong", but Shubhra Gupta of The Indian Express thought that despite Sanon's effort, her performance lacked naturalism.

Sanon worked in two of Vijan's productions in 2019. She starred in cinematographer Laxman Utekar's Hindi directorial debut, Luka Chuppi, a satire on live-in relationships, which paired her opposite Kartik Aaryan. Devesh Sharma of Filmfare was appreciative of her comic timing. A commercial success, Luka Chuppi grossed  worldwide. Following an appearance in the unremarkable comedy Arjun Patiala, Sanon played one of the leading ladies in the reincarnation comedy Housefull 4, the fourth installment of the Housefull franchise, which paired her opposite Akshay Kumar. In her final appearance of 2019, Sanon portrayed Parvatibai opposite Arjun Kapoor's Sadashivrao Bhau in Ashutosh Gowariker's period drama Panipat, based on the Third Battle of Panipat, which emerged as a box-office bomb.

Mimi and beyond (2021–present) 

Sanon collaborated once again with Vijan and Utekar in the comedy-drama Mimi (2021), which proved to be a turning point in her career. A remake of the 2011 Marathi drama Mala Aai Vhhaychy!, it starred her in the title role of an aspiring actress who becomes a surrogate mother. Sanon gained 15kgs of weight for scenes involving her character's pregnancy. The film was released digitally on Netflix and JioCinema. Critics were generally unimpressed with the film, but Sanon's performance was picked up for praise, with Mashable India deeming it a career-best. Pallabi Dey Purkayastha of WION wrote that Sanon had succeeded in her "attempt to establish herself as a standalone actor, not just a pretty heroine" and took particular note of the subtlety in her performance. Sanon was awarded the IIFA Award for Best Actress and the Filmfare Award for Best Actress.

Sanon's next release, the comedy Hum Do Hamare Do (2021) opposite Rajkummar Rao, premiered on Disney+ Hotstar. Saibal Chatterjee found hers to be "the most noteworthy performance in [the] unfunny caper". Her first release in 2022 came with the action comedy Bachchhan Paandey, which marked her second collaboration with Akshay Kumar. Adapted from the 2014 Tamil film Jigarthanda, Sanon played a part originally portrayed by a male actor. The film was unable to recoup its  investment. Sanon starred with Varun Dhawan in Bhediya, the third installment in Dinesh Vijan's horror-comedy universe. It was shot over a span of two months in various locations of Arunachal Pradesh. Sonal Dedhia of News18 noted how much she stood out in the film despite her limited screen time. 

In 2023, Sanon played the leading lady opposite Kartik Aaryan in Shehzada, a remake of the Telugu film Ala Vaikunthapurramuloo. The film was a critical and commercial failure, with Zinia Bandyopadhyay of India Today dismissing her as "completely wasted". Sanon will next reunite with Tiger Shroff in Vikas Bahl's action film Ganapath. She will play Janaki in Om Raut's mythological film Adipurush (2023), co-starring Prabhas and Saif Ali Khan. and star with Shahid Kapoor in an as-yet untitled romantic comedy.

Other work and media image

She was ranked 17th in GQ India's "30 most influential young Indians" list of 2022. She has a large social media footprint, with over 52 million followers on Instagram. 

In 2021, she modelled for designer Manish Malhotra's bridal collection "Nooraniyat". During the COVID-19 pandemic, she donated a sum to the government's fund. Sanon also collected funds for Kailash Sathyarthi Children's Foundation. Sanon has performed at the opening ceremony of the 2017 Indian Premier League and the 2023 Women's Premier League.

Sanon is an endorser for several brands and products including Coca-Cola, Titan's Raga, Parachute and Tissot. In 2021, Sanon ranked 4th in Rediff.coms "10 Best Actresses" list. In Times' 50 Most Desirable Women list, she ranked 14th in 2017, 13th in 2018, 15th in 2019 and 19th in 2020. Sanon has been vocal on various topics including pay disparity in Bollywood and the "patriarchal mindset". In 2016, Sanon launched her own clothing line, named Ms. Taken. In 2022, she cofounded a fitness startup named The Tribe.

Filmography

Films 

All films are in Hindi unless otherwise noted.

Music videos

Awards and nominations

References

External links 
 
 
 

1990 births
Living people
Punjabi people
Indian film actresses
Actresses in Hindi cinema
Actresses in Telugu cinema
21st-century Indian actresses
Female models from Delhi
Jaypee Institute of Information Technology alumni
Actresses from New Delhi
Filmfare Awards winners
International Indian Film Academy Awards winners